I Need Some Money is an album by American jazz saxophonist Eddie Harris recorded in 1974 and released on the Atlantic label.

Reception

The Allmusic review stated "Eddie Harris finally steps out as a singer in the first of a series of humorous hard-luck songs that would be the flagships of his next few LPs...  In any case, the thing he still does best here is ride a groove, the best of which is the extremely danceable... There are indications, though, that Harris' repertoire of funk sax licks is beginning to run a bit thin".

Track listing
All compositions by Eddie Harris except as indicated
 "I Need Some Money" (Harris, Bradley Bobo, Durf, Ronald Muldrow) - 3:10   
 "Get On Down" (Calvin Barnes, Durf, Ronald Muldrow, Rufus Reid) -  9:48   
 "Time to Do Your Thing" (Sara E. Harris) - 6:12   
 "Carnival" - 4:14   
 "Don't Want Nobody" (Sara E. Harris) - 11:52   
 "Bumpin" (Harris, Ronald Muldrow) - 4:11   
 "That's It" - 5:31  
Recorded at Paragon Studios in Chicago on July 15 (tracks 2 & 4-6) and December 2 (tracks 1, 3 & 7), 1974

Personnel
Eddie Harris - tenor saxophone, varitone, piano, organ, electric piano, reed trumpet, vocals
Ronald Muldrow - guitar, guitorgan, cabasa
Rufus Reid - electric bass, bass (tracks 2 & 4-6)
Bradley Bobo - bass, 6 string bass (tracks 1, 3 & 7) 
Durf - congas, vocals, African whistle, talking drum, timpani, tablas, barrel drum
Calvin Barnes - drums, quica, Latin percussion

References 

Eddie Harris albums
1975 albums
Atlantic Records albums